Trigonopterus merubetirensis is a species of flightless weevil in the genus Trigonopterus from Indonesia.

Etymology
The specific name is derived from that of the type locality.

Description
Individuals measure 2.88–3.31 mm in length.  General coloration is black, except for the legs and head, which are rust-colored, and the elytra, which are dark rust colored with a faint black stripe running transversely across the middle and a blacks spot at the apex.

Range

Phylogeny
T. merubetirensis is part of the T. dimorphus species group.

References

merubetirensis
Beetles described in 2014
Beetles of Asia
Insects of Indonesia